Inside Out Music is a German independent record label originally based in Kleve, North Rhine-Westphalia, and dedicated to the publication of progressive rock, progressive metal and related styles. In 2009, it formed a partnership with Century Media Records and moved its base of operations to Dortmund, also in North Rhine-Westphalia. In August 2015, Century Media was acquired by Sony Music and became its premier label for progressive music.

History
The label was founded in 1993 by Thomas Waber and Michael Schmitz and started its publications re-issuing albums of new American prog metal acts like Symphony X and Shadow Gallery for the European market and then signing important prog artists like Steve Hackett. Inside Out signed a worldwide distribution contract with the German music company SPV and branched out with the American division InsideOut US, based in Pittsburgh, Pennsylvania. In 2009 SPV had to file for bankruptcy, and Inside Out partnered up with Century Media Records, which had secured a worldwide distribution contract with EMI.

Several important bands of the new school of progressive rock are signed to Inside Out, including Riverside, Haken, Pain of Salvation, Spock's Beard, The Safety Fire, The Flower Kings and Enchant. In addition, the label established links to other relevant bands in the Prog scene, issuing the solo albums of Dream Theater vocalist James LaBrie and a selection of Mike Portnoy's side projects.

For some time, Inside Out also published digitally reworked re-releases of albums from the Krautrock era (for example, from the band Kraan) under the sub-label Revisited Records.

The surrounding area of the label headquarters has often served as an inspiration for the album art. For example, the petrol dispenser of Spock's Beard Octane cover is in Kleve as is the lake on Threshold's Subsurface cover.

A characteristic feature for the label's releases is their lavish publication work. Several albums appear in special editions, containing extensive bonus materials such as bonus tracks, extended artwork and/or multimedia segments.

The label's founder, Thomas Waber, won the "Guiding Light" award at the 2013 Progressive Music Awards.
The label signed Dream Theater in December 2017, arguably the biggest signing in the label's history at that point.

Artists

Current

 Affector
 Anderson/Stolt
 Anneke van Giersbergen
 ...And You Will Know Us by the Trail of Dead
 Banco del Mutuo Soccorso 
 Beardfish
 Bent Knee
 Bigelf
 Caligula's Horse
 Derek Sherinian
 Devin Townsend
 Dream Theater
 Enchant
 Frost*
 Gösta Berlings Saga
 Haken
 Jakko Jakszyk
 James LaBrie
 Jethro Tull
 Jolly
 Kaipa
 Kansas
 Karmakanic
 King's X
 Kino
 Knifeworld 
 Leprous
 Liquid Tension Experiment
 Lonely Robot
 Long Distance Calling
 Maschine
 Nad Sylvan
 Neal Morse
 Next To None
 Pain of Salvation
 Pattern-Seeking Animals
 Perfect Beings
 Port Noir
 Premiata Forneria Marconi
 Pure Reason Revolution
 Rikard Sjöblom's Gungfly
 Riverside
 Roine Stolt
 Shadow Gallery
 Sons of Apollo
 Spiritual Beggars
 Spock's Beard
 Star One
 Steve Hackett (except Japan)
 The Flower Kings (except Japan)
 The Fringe
 The Mute Gods
 The Safety Fire
 The Sea Within
 The Shadow Theory
 The Tangent
 Thought Chamber
 Tim Bowness (from No-Man)
 Transatlantic
 Toundra
 VUUR
 John Wesley
 Yes

Former

 Above Symmetry
 A.C.T
 Amaseffer
 Arjen Anthony Lucassen (Ayreon)
 Asia
 California Guitar Trio
 Chroma Key
 Conspiracy
 
 David Lindley
 Deadsoul Tribe
 Derek Sherinian
 Dominici
 Ephrat
 Evergrey
 Fates Warning
 GPS
 IQ
 It Bites
 Jadis
 Jelly Jam, The
 Jerry Gaskill
 Jughead
 Kevin Moore
 Mastermind
 OSI
 Paatos
 Pallas
 Planet X
 Poverty's No Crime
 Ray Wilson* 
 Redemption
 RPWL
 Ryo Okumoto
 Saga
 Slavior
 Sound of Contact
 Stream of Passion
 Stealing Axion
 Steve Howe
 Symphony X
 Threshold
 Tiles
 Trey Gunn (former member of King Crimson)
 Ty Tabor
 Ulysses
 United Progressive Fraternity
 Unitopia
 Vanden Plas

Revisited Records label 
This label specializes in the reissue of selected Krautrock and electronic pioneers, including:
 Amon Düül II
 Klaus Schulze
 Kraan

References

External links
 Official website
 Revisited Records at Discogs

German independent record labels
Rock record labels
Progressive rock record labels
IFPI members
Heavy metal record labels
Sony Music
Mass media in Dortmund
Companies based in Dortmund